Yūkichi, Yukichi or Yuukichi is a masculine Japanese given name.

Possible writings
Yūkichi can be written using different combinations of kanji characters. Here are some examples: 

勇吉, "courage, good luck"
祐吉, "to help, good luck"
佑吉, "to help, good luck"
裕吉, "abundant, good luck"
雄吉, "male, good luck"
友吉, "friend, good luck"
悠吉, "long time, good luck"
優吉, "superiority, good luck"
有吉, "to have, good luck"
邑吉, "village, good luck"

The name can also be written in hiragana ゆうきち or katakana ユウキチ.

Yukichi is a separate given name.

諭吉, "to persuade, good luck"
愉吉, "pleased, good luck"
愈吉, "more and more, good luck"

And can also be written in hiragana ゆきち or katakana ユキチ.

Notable people with the name

 (born 1933), Japanese writer
 (born 1960), Japanese politician
 (1886–1958), Japanese scholar
 (1924–1993), Japanese photographer
 (1835–1901), Japanese writer

Other uses
 10,000 yen notes are sometimes referred to as "Yukichi" due to them depicting Yukichi Fukuzawa

Japanese masculine given names